The 1952 United States Senate election in North Dakota took place on November 4, 1952, to elect a member of the United States Senate to represent the State of North Dakota, concurrently with other Class 1 elections to the Senate and various other federal, state, and local elections. 

Incumbent Republican-NPL Senator William Langer was re-elected to a third term with 66.35% of the vote, defeating Democratic candidate Harold A. Morrison with 23.26% of the vote and independent candidate Fred G. Aandahl with 10.40% of the vote. Aandahl, the 23rd Governor of North Dakota, ran as an independent after having failed to defeat Langer in the Republican primary.

General election

Notes

External links
 1952 North Dakota U.S. Senate Election results

1952
North Dakota
United States Senate